Moxie Falls is a waterfall in Somerset County, Maine.

The hiking trail to Moxie Falls is approximately 1 mile with a boardwalk for viewing the falls at the end. There are several pools for swimming upstream of the falls.

Moxie Pond

Baker Stream discharges into the upstream south end of Moxie Pond, where the stream is crossed by the Appalachian Trail. Baker Pond receives flow from Dimmick Stream. Dimmick Stream originates from Mountain Dimmick Pond on Moxie Mountain, and flows approximately  through Big Dimmick Pond and Little Dimmick Pond before reaching Baker Pond. Baker Stream also receives drainage from Moxie Bog and Wild Brook in Bald Mountain Township.

Mosquito Stream flows  from Mosquito Mountain through Mosquito Pond into Moxie Pond. Little Sandy Stream with a length of  also flows into the west side of Moxie Pond.

The Maine Central Railroad Kineo branch was built along the west side of Moxie pond in 1906 serving a sawmill at the north end outlet of the pond and a logging branch to Bald Mountain from the south end of the pond. The railroad was dismantled in 1933.

References

External links 

Waterfalls of Maine
Landforms of Somerset County, Maine
Plunge waterfalls